Eugene Redd (October 31, 1899 – August 23, 1955) was an American Negro league third baseman in the 1920s.

A native of Kansas City, Missouri, Redd made his Negro leagues debut in 1922 for the Cleveland Tate Stars. The following season, he played for the Milwaukee Bears. Redd died in Kansas City in 1955 at age 55.

References

External links
 and Seamheads

1899 births
1955 deaths
Cleveland Tate Stars players
Milwaukee Bears players
Baseball third basemen
Baseball players from Kansas City, Missouri
20th-century African-American sportspeople